The Eastern Zone was one of the three regional zones of the 1985 Davis Cup.

12 teams entered the Eastern Zone in total, with the winner promoted to the following year's World Group. New Zealand defeated South Korea in the final and qualified for the 1986 World Group.

Participating nations

Draw

First round

Chinese Taipei vs. Sri Lanka

Singapore vs. Hong Kong

Malaysia vs. Philippines

South Korea vs. Indonesia

Quarterfinals

New Zealand vs. Chinese Taipei

China vs. Hong Kong

Thailand vs. Philippines

Pakistan vs. South Korea

Semifinals

New Zealand vs. China

Philippines vs. South Korea

Final

New Zealand vs. South Korea

References

External links
Davis Cup official website

Davis Cup Asia/Oceania Zone
Eastern Zone